Charles Alexander Woolley is a New Zealand international rugby league footballer who represented New Zealand.

Background
Woolley was born in Adelaide, South Australia. He worked for the Fire Brigade in Auckland and in 1922 was awarded service bars for 15 years service at the City Fire Brigade's annual social.

Playing career
He played for the Grafton Athletic club in the Auckland Rugby League competition and represented Auckland against the 1914 Great Britain Lions.

Woolley fought in World War 1 with his period of service totaling 4 years and 6 days, including 3 years and 209 days overseas. He spent 1915-16 in Egypt, and 1916-18 in Western Europe. Woolley was promoted to sergeant on June 16, 1918. He was awarded the British War Medal and the Victory Medal.

In 1920, after World War I, Woolley was a part of the Auckland side that defeated the 1920 Great Britain Lions, 24–16 on 24 July and becoming the first New Zealand team to defeat Great Britain on New Zealand soil. He then represented New Zealand, playing in all three test matches against the Lions. He toured Australia with the Kiwis in 1921, but no test matches were played during the tour.

References

New Zealand rugby league players
New Zealand national rugby league team players
Auckland rugby league team players
Australian emigrants to New Zealand
North Island rugby league team players
City Rovers players
Grafton Athletic players
Rugby league wingers
Rugby league centres
Sportspeople from Adelaide